Arab diaspora refers to descendants of the Arab emigrants who, voluntarily or as refugees, emigrated from their native lands to non-Arab countries, primarily in the Americas, Europe, Southeast Asia, and West Africa. Emigrants from Arab countries, such as Sudan and the Palestinian territories, also form significant diasporas in other Arab states.

Overview
Arab expatriates contribute to the circulation of financial and human capital in the region and thus significantly promote regional development. In 2009 Arab countries received a total of US$35.1 billion in remittance in-flows and remittances sent to Jordan, Egypt and Lebanon from other Arab countries are 40 to 190 per cent higher than trade revenues between these and other Arab countries. Large numbers of Arabs migrated to West Africa, particularly Côte d'Ivoire, Senegal, Sierra Leone, Liberia, and Nigeria. Since the end of the civil war in 2002, Lebanese traders have become re-established in Sierra Leone.

According to Saudi Aramco World, the largest concentration of Arabs outside the Arab World is in Brazil, which has 9 million Brazilians of Arab ancestry. Of these 9 million Arabs, 6 million are of Lebanese ancestry, making Brazil's population of Lebanese equivalent to that of Lebanon itself. However, these figures are contradicted by the Brazilian Institute of Geography and Statistics (IBGE), which is the agency responsible for official collection of statistical information in Brazil. According to the 2010 Brazilian census conducted by IBGE, there were only 12,336 Lebanese nationals living in Brazil and other Arab nationalities were so small that they were not even listed. The Brazilian census does not ask about ancestry or family origin. There is a question about nationality and, according to the Brazilian law, any person born in Brazil is a Brazilian national by birth and right for any purpose, nationally or internationally - not an Arab. The last Brazilian census to ask about family origin was conducted in 1940. At that time, 107,074 Brazilians said they had a Syrian, Lebanese, Palestinian, Iraqi or Arab father. Native Arabs were 46,105 and naturalized Brazilians were 5,447. In 1940, Brazil had 41,169,321 inhabitants, hence Arabs and their children were 0.38% of Brazil's population in 1940.

Colombia, Argentina, Venezuela, Mexico and Chile. Palestinians cluster in Chile and Central America, particularly El Salvador, and Honduras. The Palestinian community in Chile is the fourth largest in the world after those in Israel, Lebanon, and Jordan. Arab Haitians (a large number of whom live in the capital) are more often than not, concentrated in financial areas where the majority of them establish businesses. In the United States, there are around 3.5 million people of Arab ancestry.

It has been estimated that there are as many as four million Indonesians with at least partial Arab ancestry. They are generally well-integrated socially with Indonesian society, and identify as Indonesians. In the 2010 census, 118,886 people, amounting to 0.05% of the population, identified themselves as being of Arab ethnicity.

See also 

 Algerian British
 Arab Americans
 Arab Argentines
 Arab Australians
 Arab Brazilians
 Arab Canadians
 Arab Chileans
 Arab Colombians
 Arab Haitians
 Arab Indonesians
 Arab Mexicans
 Arab New Zealanders
 Arab Singaporeans
 Arab Venezuelans
 Arabs in Austria
 Arabs in Bulgaria
 Arabs in Europe
 Arabs in Finland
 Arabs in France
 Arabs in Germany
 Arabs in Greece
 Arabs in India
 Arabs in Italy
 Arabs in Japan
 Arabs in the Netherlands
 Arabs in Pakistan
 Arabs in Romania
 Arabs in Serbia
 Arabs in Spain
 Arabs in Sweden
 Arabs in Switzerland
 Arabs in Turkey
 Arma people (Saharan Arab and Spanish)
 British Arabs
 British Iraqis
 Chaush (Yemenis in South India)
 Egyptians in the United Kingdom
 Emirati diaspora
 Hadhrami diaspora
 History of Arabs in Afghanistan
 Iraqi Biradari (Iraqis residing in India and Pakistan)
 Iraqi diaspora
 Lebanese Americans
 Lebanese Argentines
 Lebanese Australians
 Lebanese Brazilians
 Lebanese Canadians
 Lebanese diaspora
 Lebanese people in Ecuador
 List of Arab Americans
 Magyarab people (Egyptian Arab and Hungarian)
 Palestinian diaspora
 Refugees of Iraq
 Sri Lankan Moors
 Syrian Americans
 Yemeni Americans
 Yemenis in the United Kingdom

References 
Notes

Citations

Further reading 
 Niger's Arabs to fight expulsion
 Out of the Hadhramaut
 Arab Immigrants in Latin American Politics
 Descendants of Arabs thriving in S. America
 The Arrival Of The Lebanese to Jamaica
 "Arab roots grow deep in Brazil's rich melting pot", The Washington Times.

External links 
 
 International Organization for Migration - Regional Office for the Middle East
 The Lebanese of South Africa
 The Arabs of Honduras
 The Arabs of Brazil
 Lebanese Social and Cultural Community in Ireland

 
Diaspora
North African diaspora
Middle Eastern diaspora